Joan Binimelis (1538–1616) was a Spanish priest, physician, geographer, astronomer and writer.

People from Manacor
Catalan-language writers
1538 births
1616 deaths